Raina is a village in Raina I CD block in Bardhaman Sadar South subdivision of Purba Bardhaman district in the Indian state of West Bengal.

Geography

Urbanisation
95.54% of the population of Bardhaman Sadar South subdivision live in rural areas versus 4.46% in urban areas, the lowest proportion of urban population amongst the four subdivisions in Purba Bardhaman district.

Services
Raina police station has jurisdiction over Raina I CD Block. The area covered is 266.43 km2.

Demographics
As per the 2011 Census of India Raina had a total population of 5,157, of which 2,619 (51%) were males and 2,538 (49%) were females. Population under 6 was 494. The total number of literates in Raina was 3,872 (83.04% of the population over 6 years).

Transport
Rainagar railway station is on the Bankura-Mathnasipur sector of Bankura-Masagram line in Raina. As of January 2019, DEMU services are available between Bankura and Masagram.

Raina is connected with Burdwan town, Tarokeshor, Memary by road.

Education
Raina's education system was strong even before independence. Raina Swami Bholananda Vidyayatan (RSBV) established in 1894, meeting the higher secondary standard. Raina Jagathmata Anchalik Balika Vidyalaya, was established in 1963 by Muslim education activists. Professionals such as engineers, professors, postgraduates, administrators and teachers attended RSBV.

Healthcare
Maheshbati Rural Hospital at Maheshbati is located nearby.

References

Villages in Purba Bardhaman district